= Bhoj Nagar =

- village
- Location within Madhya Pradesh Location within India
- Coordinates: 23.112603°N 77.453777°E
- Country: India
- State: Madhya Pradesh
- District: Bhopal
- Tehsil: Huzur

Population (2011)
  - Total: 199
- Time zone: UTC+5:30 (IST)
- ISO 3166 code: MP-IN
- Census code: 482534

Bhoj Nagar is a village in the Bhopal district of Madhya Pradesh, India. It is located in the Huzur tehsil and the Phanda block.

== Demographics ==
According to the 2011 census of India, Bhoj Nagar has 36 households. The effective literacy rate (i.e. the literacy rate of population excluding children aged 6 and below) is 73.33%.

Demographics (2011 Census)
	Total	Male	Female
Population	199	100	99
Children aged below 6 years	34	16	18
Scheduled caste	6	3	3
Scheduled tribe	0	0	0
Literates	121	67	54
Workers (all)	71	54	17
Main workers (total)	57	50	7
Main workers: Cultivators	34	29	5
Main workers: Agricultural labourers	7	6	1
Main workers: Household industry workers	0	0	0
Main workers: Other	16	15	1
Marginal workers (total)	14	4	10
Marginal workers: Cultivators	8	2	6
Marginal workers: Agricultural labourers	6	2	4
Marginal workers: Household industry workers	0	0	0
Marginal workers: Others	0	0	0
Non-workers	128	46	82
